1300 Oslo (active from 1979 in Oslo, Norway) was a Norwegian jazz band originally called Oslo 13 (1979–93), founded and operated the first two years by Bror Hagemann and continuated by Jon Balke. In 1994 the band got a joint leadership with Trygve Seim, Morten Halle and Torbjørn Sunde, and changed their name.

The band's first release was the album Anti-therapy (1981). Oslo 13 was awarded Spellemannprisen in 1988 for the album Off balance. The follow up Nonsentration (1992) also was an acclaimed album. The last album from Oslo 13 was a live album from 1992.

Band members

Woodwinds
Morten Halle (tenor and alt sax)
Tore Brunborg (tenor sax)
Odd Riisnæs (tenor sax)
Nancy Sandvold (baritone sax)
Erik Balke (alto sax)
Olav Dale (saxophone)
Arne Frang (tenor sax)
Trygve Seim (saxophone)
Thomas Gustavsson (saxophone)
Rune Nicolaysen (tenor sax)

Brass
Trumpet
Bror Hagemann
Nils Petter Molvær
Jens Petter Antonsen
Staffan Svensson
Geir Hauger

Tuba
Geir Løvold

Trombone
Torbjørn Sunde
Dag Einar Eilertsen
Thor Bjørn Neby (bass trombone)

Rhythm section
Audun Kleive (drums)
Jon Christensen (drums)
Carl Morten Iversen (bass)
Jon Balke (keyboards)

Discography
1981: Anti therapy (Odin)
1988: Off balance (Odin)
1992: Nonsentration (ECM)
1992: Live (Curling Legs)
2001: Live in the North (Curling Legs)

References

Norwegian jazz ensembles
Big bands
Spellemannprisen winners
ECM Records artists
Musical groups established in 1980
1980 establishments in Norway
Musical groups from Oslo